The 1964 Maine Black Bears football team was an American football team that represented the University of Maine as a member of the Yankee Conference during the 1964 NCAA College Division football season. In its 14th season under head coach Harold Westerman, the team compiled a 5–3 record (2–3 against conference opponents) and finished fourth out of the six teams in the Yankee Conference. The team played its home games at Alumni Field in Orono, Maine. Michael Haley and Ernest Smith were the team captains.

Schedule

References

Maine
Maine Black Bears football seasons
Maine Black Bears football